Franklin Rumbiak (born 12 November 1989) is an Indonesian professional footballer who currently plays as a midfielder for Perseru Serui in the Indonesia Super League.

Career

Perseru Serui
On 18 May 2014, he scored his first goal for Perseru in a 1–1 draw against Persiba Bantul.

References

External links
 
 Player profil at goal.com

1989 births
Living people
Indonesian footballers
Liga 1 (Indonesia) players
Perseru Serui players
Perseru Serui
Badak Lampung F.C. players
Association football midfielders